R. trilobata  may refer to:
 Rana trilobata, a synonym for Rana megapoda, a frog species endemic to Mexico
 Rhus trilobata, the sourberry, skunkbush or three-leaf sumac, a shrub species native to the western half of Canada and the United States

See also
 Trilobata